Kongsberg is a historical mining town and municipality in Buskerud, Viken county, Norway. The city is located on the river Numedalslågen at the entrance to the valley of Numedal. Kongsberg has been a centre of silver mining, arms production and forestry for centuries, and is the site of high technology industry including the headquarters of Norway's largest defence contractor Kongsberg Gruppen.

Kongsberg, formerly spelled Konningsberg ( "King's Mountain"), was developed as a mining city on the basis of the Kongsberg Silver Mines, founded by and named after King Christian IV of Denmark and Norway in 1624. The king invited German engineers and other specialists from Saxony and the Harz region to help build the mining company. As a mining city, Kongsberg had a distinct urban culture that contrasted with its surroundings, strongly influenced by the traditions of mining communities in Germany and where the German language was extensively used in mining business and for religious services. In the first years nearly half of the city's population were German immigrants, and the majority of the engineers and executives were German immigrants and their descendants well into the 19th century, becoming a distinct social class called mining families that formed the educated social elite of Kongsberg in contrast to the Norwegian farming population; the first Nobel laureate in economics Ragnar Frisch belonged to such a Kongsberg mining family. By the 18th century Kongsberg was Norway's second largest city, second only to Bergen. Kongsberg was one of Norway's two privileged mining cities and thus formed a special mining jurisdiction, and only became part of Buskerud county in 1760. On 1 January 1838, the new national law, creating local governments, made Kongsberg a municipality. The rural municipalities of Ytre Sandsvær and Øvre Sandsvær were merged into the municipality of Kongsberg in 1964. Kongsberg gradually lost importance to other cities in the 19th century, particularly to the rapidly growing capital of Christiania (Oslo).

The Kongsberg Silver Mines closed in 1958 after operating for 334 years and is today a museum and the city's main tourist attraction. Kongsberg remains the site of the Royal Norwegian Mint, which mints Norwegian coins and also produces circulating and collectors' coins for other countries. Kongsberg is also the home of Norway's major defence contractor, Kongsberg Gruppen, founded in 1814. Two of its best-known products were the Kongsberg Colt and the Krag–Jørgensen rifle.

Both the University of South-Eastern Norway Kongsberg campus, and Tinius Olsen's school, a combined technical vocational college and secondary school, are located in Kongsberg.

Minorities

History

Kongsberg was founded by Danish-Norwegian King Christian IV as a mining community in 1624 after the discovery of silver. In its second year, the town of Kongsberg and the Kongsberg Silver Mines began. According to official records, silver was first discovered by the shepherds children Helga Verp and Jacob Grosvold in the summer of 1623. However, the existence of deposits of precious metals was known previously, as evidenced by indications of earlier silver mining. With the rise of silver mining, Kongsberg became the largest industrial center in Norway before the industrial revolution. At the peak of silver mining in the early eighteenth century, Kongsberg's silver mines and related industries contributed 10% of the Denmark–Norway gross national product.

To develop the Kongsberg Silver Mines, Christian IV hired Germans from the silver mines of Saxony and Harz and brought in Germans from other mines in Norway. The Germans brought their knowledge of mining technology, especially important during the start-up phase. Before 1623, the city was located in the royal territory of Sandsvær.

Four years after the establishment of the Kongsberg Silver Mines, most of the 1,500 workers and officials were still German. Gradually, Norwegians entered the workforce and were hired as supervisors. In 1636, 1,370 Germans and 1,600 Norwegians were employed there. In 1648, there were 1,500 Germans and 2,400 Norwegians working in Kongsberg.

Gunpowder was officially introduced in mining in 1681. Mining in the particularly hard rock of Kongsberg Mountain was energy intensive, so the silver mine continued to develop new technology to reduce production costs. A large artificial dam powered the mine's hoists before electricity was introduced. In 1624, a road from Hokksund to Kongsberg was built to serve the Kongsberg Silver Mines, the most important road built in Norway in the 17th century. In 1665, the road was extended to Kristiansand and Larvik.

By 1683, the mining industry was an important industry of the state. The rapid development of Kongsberg meant that the number of workers in the city had increased significantly by the end of the 17th century. The proportion of Norwegians in the workforce increased, but for a long time, the main staff was dominated by Germans. Kongsberg was almost an outpost of Germany in Norway: the mine had a German name, and the official language was German, only later becoming bilingual (German and Danish). In Kongsberg, the German mountain justice system was also used. Legally, this means that the city was bound by independent regulations, partially separating the mining community from the country's legal system. The Germans brought with them the Knappschaft, a guild-like association of miners that provided including free medical assistance, a pension plan, worker sick leave and a Saturday break. The ring agriculture characteristic of Kongsberg may also have been inspired by the German pattern.

The proceeds from silver mining provided a valuable assistance to the tight finances of Denmark. Denmark–Norway relied heavily on the silver of Kongsberg to support an ongoing war against Sweden. Precious metals also became more and more important in the currency, and to get closer to its source of raw materials, the Royal Mint moved in 1686 from Akershus to Kongsberg. During the Great Northern War in 1716, the city became the main target of Karl XII’s foray into Norderhof.

Kongsberg was particularly known for its Kongsberg Silver Mines and their high purity. Kongsberg's ore also contained a certain amount of gold and large amounts of copper, cobalt, lead-zinc and fluorite. Roughly   of silver was extracted between the discovery of the silver ore seams in 1623 and the last year of mining in 1957. The workforce at the Kongsberg silver mine began to increase substantially at the end of the 17th century. In the 1769 census, the mines employed about 4,000 workers. With 8,000 inhabitants in all, the town was the second largest in Norway, after Bergen (and thus larger than today's capital, Oslo).

In Norway's 1749 census, Kongsberg was the most populous town in Eastern Norway. It was granted its royal charter of trade—amounting to official township—in 1802. Following several hard years with reduced silver output from the mines, the war of 1807–1814, and a severe town fire in 1810 where 56 houses on the west side were destroyed, mining was complemented by the government establishing a defense industry in 1814. By 1835, the population had declined to 3,540.

Kongsberg is home to the Royal Norwegian Mint, which mints Norwegian coins and also produces circulating and collectors' coins for other countries such as Israel. It was established in 1686, and was renamed from the Royal Norwegian Mint in 2004 after having been sold to private investors (the Mint of Finland and Norwegian company Samlerhuset) in 2003. Kongsberg is also the site of the Kongsberg School of Mines (Kongsberg Bergseminar), an academic institution for mining technology which operated from 1757 to 1814.

During peaceful times, the defence industry gradually evolved into many other kinds of high tech activities as well, now dominating the town's employment. In 1987, however, the state-owned Kongsberg Weapons Factory (Kongsberg Vaapenfabrikk) suffered a major financial crisis as well as accusations of breaching the CoCom rules by selling sensitive technology to the Soviet bloc. As a result, the company was split into several smaller units and partly sold to private investors. Today, the separate firms thrive as one of Norway's main high-tech industrial clusters, centering on the defence and maritime company Kongsberg Gruppen which is listed on the Oslo Stock Exchange.

On 13 October 2021, a man stabbed multiple people with a bladed weapon, killing five and injuring three. Police subsequently apprehended a suspect whom the Kongsberg police chief later told reporters was a Muslim convert.

Coat-of-arms
The coat-of-arms is from modern times and was designed by Hallvard Trætteberg. They were granted on 25 August 1972. They are based upon the old seal for the city from 1689 which shows the Roman god Janus dressed as an emperor (to represent the king); the sword and the pair of scales represents justice. The colour green represents the forests, silver represents the mountains, and gold represents wealth.

Geography
Kongsberg is located at the mouth of the valley Numedal; farther to the South the valley is called Lågendalen.

The neighbouring municipalities of Kongsberg are Flesberg to the north; Øvre Eiker and Hof to the east; Lardal, Siljan, and Skien to the south; and Sauherad and Notodden to the west. Of these, the two first lie in Buskerud county like Kongsberg, while Hof and Lardal lie in Vestfold, and the others lie in Telemark. The town is divided by the river Numedalslågen, which has three waterfalls in the town itself.

Climate
Kongsberg has a humid continental climate (Dfb), with late summer and autumn as the wettest season and February - April as the driest season. Kongsberg has warm summers by Norwegian standards; average daily highs in summer are comparable to Oslo. In winter Kongsberg is colder than Oslo, and snow cover on the ground is common. The largest snow depth recorded is 123 cm on 3 March 2006.The all-time high temperature  was recorded 19 June 1970, while 10 August 1975 recorded . The all-time low  was recorded 3 January 1941. As pr January 2022, all monthly record lows are old, 11 from before 1950. All record highs are from after 1950, 5 of 12 from after 2000 (pr January 2022). Kongsberg has recorded  as early as 14 May (in 2000). The weather station Kongsberg brannstasjon has recorded since 2003, extremes includes data from Kongsberg II, III and IV.

Transportation
The main highways are the E134, crossing Kongsberg east to west (and connected to the E18 to Oslo), and Norwegian national road 40 (Riksvei 40), going north to south. The Sørland Line stops at Kongsberg Rail Station, with connection to local and regional bus lines.

Culture

With the population increase during the town's silver mining heyday of the mid-eighteenth century came the need for a new church, which was built over a 21-year period and inaugurated in 1761. It has an austere red brick exterior, but a richly decorated baroque interior including unique chandeliers made at Nøstetangen Glass Works in neighbouring Hokksund. Kongsberg Church remains one of the largest in Norway with a seating capacity of 2,400.

The church's original baroque-era pipe organ, made by renowned German organ builder Gottfried Heinrich Gloger in 1760–65, was fully restored by Jürgen Ahrend in 1999–2000 and reopened to great fanfare in January 2001. With its 42 voices, it is the largest baroque organ in Scandinavia. At the end of January each year, the Gloger Music Festival now draws a select crowd of artists and music lovers from all over the world.

Since 1964, Kongsberg has hosted Kongsberg Jazzfestival, an annual international jazz festival. Heavily sponsored by the local industry, prominent world acts such as BB King, Diana Krall, Ornette Coleman, Joshua Redman and John Scofield have played at the festival in recent years.

Sports
The town is known for many great ski jumpers. Birger Ruud and his two brothers, as well as many other townsmen, such as Petter Hugsted, won numerous medals in Winter Olympics and other international championships in the 1930s and 1940s. The first ski jumping technique, the Konsberger was developed by Jacob Tullin Thams and Sigmund Ruud in Kongsberg, and was the most popular ski jumping technique from the late 1920s to the late 1950s. Their medals and equipment can be seen at the Kongsberg Skiing Museum (Kongsberg Skimuseum) which is co-located with the Norwegian Mining Museum (Norsk Bergverksmuseum) in central Kongsberg. Inventor of the modern ski binding, Norwegian-American skier and Olympic skiing coach Hjalmar Hvam, was born in Kongsberg in 1902.
Recent winter sports athletes of the Kongsberg region include Olympic snowboarders Stine Brun Kjeldaas, Silje Norendal and Halvor Lunn; cross-country ski sprinter Børre Næss of the village Efteløt; and ski jumper Sigurd Pettersen of nearby municipality Rollag (60 km/37 mi north of Kongsberg). A large ski centre for alpine skiing and snowboarding, with several lifts and ca 320 m of height difference has been in operation and gradually expanding since 1965. Kongsberg hosted the cross-country skiing parts of the 2006 Nordic skiing National Championships. The arranging sports club was IL Skrim, the ski tracks being located at Heistadmoen, a former military camp.

The local basketball team Kongsberg Miners is regarded one of the best teams in the country.

The 1978 World Orienteering Championships were held in Kongsberg.

The crowns in Håvet

This attraction (Kronene i Håvet) is a site where Norwegian royal monograms have been carved into the mountainside overlooking Kongsberg to mark royal visits to the city. In June 1704 King Frederik IV visited Kongsberg and started a tradition that is still celebrated. King Frederik also arranged for the monograms of visits from earlier monarchs to be recorded as well.

The first monogram on the hillside property belonged to Christian IV who in 1624 founded Kongsberg at the site of the newly discovered silver deposits. His visit was followed by that of Frederik III (1648) and Christian V (1685). Christian VI and his Queen Sofie Magdalene (1733), Frederik V (1749), Oscar I (1845), Oscar II (1890), Haakon VII (1908), Olav V (1962) and most recently Harald V (1995).

Kongsberg Technology Park 
Kongsberg Technology Park is a part of Kongsberg that is located in Kirkegårdsveien 45 and the Arsenal on Kongsgårdsmoen. It has over 5.200 employees, spread across 60 nationalities and 48 countries and can trace its roots back to 1814. Among the tenants in Kongsberg Technology Park are Kongsberg Gruppen, Kongsberg Defence & Aerospace, GKN Aerospace, Siemens Energy, Kongsberg Terotech, TechnipFMC, Data Respons, and Kongsberg Precision Cutting Systems.

The park also manages properties in Stjørdal, Horten, Sandefjord, Skedsmo, Asker, Bærum, Oslo, Rygge, Kristiansand, Stavanger, Ulsteinvik and Brattvåg.

Notable residents

Public service & public thinking 

 Johan Gerhard de Besche (1821–1875) - a physician, owned the Morgenbladet newspaper
 Christian Peder Bianco Boeck (1798–1877) - a doctor, zoologist, botanist and mountaineer
 Carl Wilhelm Boeck (1808–1875) - a Norwegian dermatologist
 Erik Brofoss (1908–1979) - Economist and jurist, politician for the Labour Party and central bank governor
 Thomas Bryn (1782–1827) - a jurist, magistrate and rep. at the Constitutional Assembly
 Anders Bugge (1889–1955) - Norwegian theologist and art historian
 Morten Thrane Esmark (1801–1882) - a Norwegian priest and mineralogist
 Sverre Fehn (1924–2009) - Architect and professor at Oslo's School of Architecture from 1971 to 1995
 Roar Flåthen (born 1950) - Union leader and LO leader from 2007 to 2013.
 Bernt Hagtvet (born 1946) - Professor of political science at the University of Oslo
 
 Paul Ernst Wilhelm Hartmann (1878–1974) - Finance minister who served in the exile government of Johan Nygaardsvold during World War II
 Iver Heltzen (1785–1842) - Norwegian priest, naturalist, and author
 Gustava Kielland (1800–1889) - Writer and missionary
 Jens Landmark (1811–1880) - a Norwegian military officer and Mayor of Kongsberg
 Tinius Olsen (1845–1932) - Norwegian-American engineer and inventor
 Ole Petter Ottersen (born 1955) - Professor of medicine and rector at the University of Oslo from 2009 to 2017
 Thoralf Skolem (1887–1963) - Professor of mathematics at the University of Oslo 
 Poul Steenstrup (1772–1864) - industrial entrepreneur and rep. the Constitutional Assembly
 Gunhild Stordalen (born 1979) - Physician and environmentalist, was married to the billionaire Petter Stordalen
 Jørgen Herman Vogt (1784–1862) - First Minister of Norway, 1855 to 1858

The Arts 

 Tine Asmundsen (born 1963) - a Norwegian jazz bassist
 Ingri d'Aulaire (1904–1980) - American writer of children's books
 Håkon Austbø (born 1948) - a classical pianist and academic in the Netherlands
 Halfdan Cleve (1879–1951) - classical composer and music teacher
 Ivar Grydeland (born 1976) - jazz guitarist, raised in Kongsberg
 Maurits Hansen (1794-1842) - journalist and novelist, teacher in Kongsberg from 1826
 Morten Harket (born 1959) - lead singer of the synthpop band a-ha
 Per Theodor Haugen (1932–2018) - actor and theater manager
 Morten Qvenild (born 1978) - jazz pianist, band leader and producer
 Otto Sinding (1842–1909) - painter, illustrator, poet and dramatist
 Christian Sinding (1856–1941) - composer and pianist

Sport 

 Hans Beck (1911–1996) - ski jumper, silver medalist at the 1932 Winter Olympics
 Ailo Gaup (born 1979) - former Freestyle Motocross rider who invented the Underflip and won world title in FMX
 Petter Hugsted (1921–2000) - ski jumper, gold medalist in the 1948 Winter Olympics
 Hjalmar Hvam (1902–1996) - Nordic skier and invented the first safety ski binding
 Bryan King (born 1947) - British footballer with over 540 club caps and scout, lives in Kongsberg
 Roy Mikkelsen (1907-1967) - an American Olympic ski jumper and US Champion
 Silje Norendal (born 1993) - Snowboarder and gold medalist in Winter X Games 
 Birger Ruud (1911–1998) - ski jumper, gold medalist at the 1932 & 1936 Winter Olympics
 Sigmund Ruud (1907–1994) - ski jumper, silver medalist at the 1928 Winter Olympics
 Magnus Sylling Olsen (born 1983) - a retired Norwegian footballer with over 250 club caps
 Daniel-André Tande (born 1994) - ski jumper and team gold medalist at the 2018 Winter Olympics

Twin towns – sister cities

Kongsberg is twinned with:

 Chitose, Japan
 Espoo, Finland
 Gouda, Netherlands
 Køge, Denmark
 Kristianstad, Sweden

 Skagafjörður, Iceland

Gallery

See also
Grøntjernkollen
Kongsberg Skiing Museum
Mykle, lake
Norwegian Mining Museum

References
Notes

External links

Photos of the town - old and new
Kongsberg Tourist Office - Comprehensive information about the town and surrounding landscape, including photos and webcams
Kongsberg Travel Guide- From VirtualTourist.com; contains tourist-submitted photos and articles
Kongsberg Jazz Festival - Official website, with lists of artists and concert dates 
The Gloger Academy - History of the Gloger Organ and information on upcoming concerts and the Gloger Music Festival 
Laagendalsposten Local newspaper covering Kongsberg and Numedal 

 
Municipalities of Buskerud
Municipalities of Viken (county)
Ski areas and resorts in Norway
Cities and towns in Norway
Populated places established in 1624
Populated places on the Numedalslågen
1624 establishments in Norway